Samuel Johansen Chukwudi (born 25 June 2003) is a Faroese footballer who plays as a defender for the youth academy of Union.

Career

Club career

In 2022, Chukwudi signed for the youth academy of Belgian side Union.

International career

He is eligible to represent Nigeria internationally.

References

External links

  

Living people
2003 births